Kal pri Dolah is a small settlement immediately north of Dole in the Municipality of Litija in central Slovenia. The area is part of the traditional region of Lower Carniola. It is now included with the rest of the municipality in the Central Sava Statistical Region; until January 2014 the municipality was part of the Central Slovenia Statistical Region.

Name
The name of the settlement was changed from Kal to Kal pri Dolah in 1953.

References

External links
Kal pri Dolah on Geopedia

Populated places in the Municipality of Litija